Zhemchug (Jemheg) is a rural locality (a selo) in Tunkinsky District, Republic of Buryatia, Russia. The population was 1,138 as of 2010. There are 16 streets.

Geography 
Zhemchug is located 24 km east of Kyren (the district's administrative centre) by road. Okhor-Shibir is the nearest rural locality.

References 

Rural localities in Tunkinsky District